The University Library of Southern Denmark (abbr. SDUB) is a library network in Denmark. It acts as a knowledge center for the entire region of Southern Denmark, with departments in six cities. Researchers and students at the University of Southern Denmark are its primary users, but companies, organizations and educational institutions, such as upper secondary schools, are also among its users.

History
In 1999, Odense University, the Southern Denmark School of Business and Engineering and the South Jutland University Centre were merged to form the University of Southern Denmark (SDU). The research libraries belonging to these institutions were merged to form the University Library of Southern Denmark.

In 2006, the Odense University College of Engineering was merged into SDU. At the same time, the Odense Technical Library became a part of SDUB. In 2007, the Business School Centre in Slagelse and the National Institute of Public Health and their libraries were also incorporated in the University of Southern Denmark.

During the last few years, some of the Library departments have been renovated. This has happened at the main library at Campusvej and in Kolding. The Technical Library will move to Campusvej in the summer of 2015.

Libraries

The University Library has several specialised sub-libraries and also collaborates with Odense University Hospital (OUH).  In Odense, there are the Mathematical Library, the Medical Research Library at OUH and the Music Department at the Carl Nielsen Academy of Music. The Music Department takes care of the jazz collection of the University Library of Southern Denmark, which is just one of the library's many special collections.

Collection
The University Library of Southern Denmark provides access to books, journals, newspapers, maps, musical scores, microfilms, and a wide variety of electronic resources. The library has about 1.6 million printed volumes and gives access to about 103.500 electronic journals, 427.000 e-books and a large number of online databases, 460 at the moment (all figures are from March 2015). The collections mainly cover the areas of study and teaching at the University of Southern Denmark, but practically all fields of study are represented at the library.

List of directors
 Torkil Olsen (1965-1982)
 Aase Lindahl (1982-2013, appointed temporarily 1982-86)
 Bertil F. Dorch (October 1, 2013 –)

Services
The University Library offers its users many services, including a number of services for researchers; bibliometrics and registration of research, and there are contact librarians for all institutes and centres.

Furthermore, the library offers e.g. course resources and Libguides, and provides many courses for users on information searching and academic conduct in various connections. The library, together with a number of other units and academic milieus at SDU, has also established a Learning Commons, where students can get help with generic academic competences.

Collaboration
The University Library of Southern Denmark participates in the national library collaboration of libraries, and therefore we can get books from all public libraries and research libraries in Denmark. The library also collaborates with partners in other countries on giving access to books and journals, both in printed and digital formats.

The Library collaborates with various external institutions, e.g. Denmark’s Electronic Research Library (DEFF), on providing services for researchers and students. This has resulted in the development of a number of online resources on plagiarism (Stopplagiat.nu), academic information management (the UB-test), and information literacy (BINKO 2.0). This last is an open source tool, and can be freely used by educational establishments who can customize it for their own students.
This has resulted in a range of online tools concerning plagiarism (Stopplagiat.nu), academic information management (UB-testen) and information literacy (BINKO).  The last-mentioned tool is open source and can, therefore, be freely used by teaching institutions in order to adapt it to their own students.

The library also participates in a number of digital projects for upper secondary schools as well as in projects on e-learning and distance learning, publishing strategies, IT didactics and online help with homework for secondary schools. At present, SDUB collaborates with 15 upper secondary schools in the region.

References
 Nielsen, Torben (red.): Odenses bibliotekshistorie, Odense Universitetsforlag, 1990, .

External links 

Academic libraries in Denmark
Libraries established in 1999
1999 establishments in Denmark